Subaşı is a belde (town) in Altınova district of Yalova Province, Turkey. Situated at   it is close to Hersek Headland of Marmara Sea and has almost merged to Altınova to the east. The population of Subaşı is 5459  as of 2010. The name of the village refers to subaşı, a title in the Ottoman bureaucracy and the residents of the town are mostly Turkish, Tatar and  Gagauz migrants who left Dobrudzha and Deliorman area in Romania today Bulgaria around 1935. The settlement was declared a seat of township in 1992 . But it suffered severely in the 7.6 magnitude 1999 İzmit earthquake.

References

Populated places in Yalova Province
Towns in Turkey
Populated places in Altınova District
Populated coastal places in Turkey